The M7, also named Jakes Gerwel Drive (previously Vanguard Drive; renamed on 18 January 2015), is a limited-access road and metropolitan route in the City of Cape Town, South Africa. It connects Acacia Park with Rocklands on the False Bay Coast via the Cape Flats.

Route 
The M7 begins at an interchange with the N1 Highway and the southern terminus of the N7 Highway adjacent to Acacia Park. The M7 begins by heading southwards as Jakes Gerwel Drive (formerly Vanguard Drive), forming the western boundary of Goodwood, to meet the R102 (Voortrekker Road). It then separates Thornton in the west from the GrandWest Casino in the east before meeting the M16 (Viking Way) and separating the two sides of the Epping Industrial Area.

It then crosses the N2 Highway and proceeds south-south-east for 9 kilometres, through Vanguard, bypassing Manenberg, through Philippi (bypassing its Horticultural Area), to reach Mitchell's Plain, where it meets the southern terminus of the R300 Freeway (Cape Flats Freeway; Peninsula Expressway). It continues southwards from the R300 junction as the western boundary of Mitchell's Plain to reach Rocklands on the False Bay coast, where it meets the M32 (Spine Road) before reaching its end at an intersection with the R310 (Baden Powell Drive) adjacent to Mnandi Beach.

References

Roads in Cape Town
Highways in South Africa
Streets and roads of Cape Town
Metropolitan routes in Cape Town